HMCS Thunder (hull number MCB 161) was a  that served in the Royal Canadian Navy during the Cold War. The ship was named for Thunder Bay. This was the third vessel to carry the name and the second in the class, replacing a previous vessel sold to France. The minesweeper entered service in 1957 and was paid off in 1997.

Design and description
The Bay class were designed and ordered as replacements for the Second World War-era minesweepers that the Royal Canadian Navy operated at the time.

They had a complement of 38 officers and ratings.

The Bay-class minesweepers were powered by two GM 12-cylinder diesel engines driving two shafts creating . The ships were armed with one 40 mm Bofors gun and were equipped with minesweeping gear.

Service history
Thunders keel was laid down on 1 September 1955 by Port Arthur Shipbuilding at Port Arthur, Ontario with the yard number 114 and launched 27 October 1956. The vessel was commissioned into the Royal Canadian Navy on 3 October 1957 with the hull identification number 144.

After commissioning, Thunder was sent west and served with Training Group Pacific. In 1972, the ship was re-designated a patrol escort and given the new hull number PF 161. In 1979, the vessel was designated a training ship and given the new hull number PB 161. Thunder was paid off on 22 August 1997.

References

Notes

Citations

References
 
 
 
 
 

 

Bay-class minesweepers
Ships built in Ontario
1956 ships
Cold War minesweepers of Canada
Minesweepers of the Royal Canadian Navy